KHJL may refer to:

 KHJL-LD, a defunct low-power television station (channel 17) formerly licensed to serve Rapid City, South Dakota, United States
 KYRA (FM), a radio station (92.7 FM) licensed to serve Thousand Oaks, California, United States, which held the call sign KHJL from 2007 to 2012